The Arab National Party (HaMiflaga HaLeumit HaAravit; , al-Hizb al-Qawmi al-Arabi) is a minor Israeli Arab political party in Israel led by Muhamad Kanan.

Background
The party was founded during the 15th Knesset when three MKs left the United Arab List; one founded National Unity – National Progressive Alliance, whilst the other two, Kanan and Tawfik Khatib created the Arab National Party.

The party did not participate in the 2003 elections, and in the run-up to the 2006 elections it looked like Kanan would join Hadash. However, the party then entered the election race, before withdrawing and announcing its support for Balad, though by then it was too late to take the party's name off the ballot. On election day the party picked up only 738 votes (0.02%), the second lowest in total and far below the electoral threshold of 2%.

The party contested the 2015 elections as part of the Arab List, an alliance with the Arab Democratic Party headed by Kanan. The alliance received just 4,301 votes (0.11%), failing to win a seat.

References

External links
Arab National Party Knesset website

Political parties established in 2001
Arab political parties in Israel
Political parties in Israel
2001 establishments in Israel